Jade Bronson North (born 7 January 1982) is an Aboriginal Australian former professional footballer who played as a centre back or right back. He was a member of the Australian national team, and is  co-chair of Football Australia's inaugural National Indigenous Advisory Group.

Early life
Jade Bronson North was born in Taree, of Biripi descent. He lived in New Zealand until the age of 11, then moved back to Australia, taking up residence in the suburb of Sunnybank in Brisbane, with his brother Brook North and parents. He attended Sunnybank High School until he was offered a place with the AIS in Canberra at the age of 15.

Club career
North joined the Brisbane Strikers as one of the youngest players to join the National Soccer League and then later moving to the Perth Glory.

He was named as the captain of the Newcastle Jets for the 2007–08 A-League season following the departure of Paul Okon.

On 9 June 2008, Australian newspapers suggested that North was due to sign with Belgian club, Club Brugge, or with Armenian club Mika F.C. However any rumours of offers proved to purely speculative, with North admitting no concrete offers had materialised.

On 3 November 2008, he was announced as the inaugural North Queensland Fury marquee player for the 2009–10 A-League season, however, after a week of rumours surrounding North's future, on 12 December 2008 it was publicised that North Queensland Fury would be releasing him from contract as he signed with South Korean K-League club Incheon United on a rumoured $2 million contract.

North trialled with Swedish side Trelleborg but on 26 February 2010, Norwegian side Tromsø IL signed the Australian defender from Incheon United. He spent four months in Norway before joining Wellington Phoenix on 30 July 2010 on a one-year deal.

On 2 April 2011, he moved from Wellington to Japanese second-tier club FC Tokyo.

On 8 January 2013, he signed a three and a half-year deal to play with Brisbane Roar in the A-League, leaving after five years in April 2018.

On 15 May 2019, North signed for National Premier League Victoria 2 side Murray United for the remainder of the season.

On 7 January 2023, North's 40th birthday, Brisbane Strikers announced a return to the club for the upcoming Football Queensland Premier League season.

International career

North's breakthrough came when he played every game of Australia's runner's up side at the 1999 FIFA U-17 World Championship where his country lost the final to Brazil on penalties. He was also a member of Australia's quarter-final effort at the 2004 Olympic Games in Athens, Greece, five years later.

In 2008, prior to the 2010 World Cup Qualifier against China, North became the first ever Aboriginal Socceroos captain for the 0–0 Draw with Singapore.

He participated in the 2008 Olympics in Beijing, China.

Other roles
In 2017, North launched a non-for-profit football program called "Kickin' With A Cuz" which was designed to reach young boys and girls through football, with a vision to create sustainable pathways and outcomes for kids to make better life choices.

In November 2021 North was appointed as co-chair of the inaugural National Indigenous Advisory Group of Football Australia. The group aims at supporting and increasing Indigenous participation in the game.

Career statistics

Club

International

Honours
Newcastle Jets
 Championship: 2007–08

Perth Glory
 NSL Championship: 2003–04

Sydney Olympic
 NSL Championship: 2001–02

Brisbane Roar
 A-League Premiers: 2013–14

Australia
 OFC Nations Cup: 2004

Australia U17
 FIFA U-17 World Cup: runner-up 1999

Individual
 A-League All Stars: 2014
 NAIDOC Sportsperson of the Year: 2016

References

External links
 Oz Football profile

 
 
 

1982 births
Living people
Indigenous Australian soccer players
Australia international soccer players
Association football central defenders
Brisbane Strikers FC players
Sydney Olympic FC players
Perth Glory FC players
Newcastle Jets FC players
Wellington Phoenix FC players
Incheon United FC players
Tromsø IL players
FC Tokyo players
Hokkaido Consadole Sapporo players
Brisbane Roar FC players
National Soccer League (Australia) players
A-League Men players
K League 1 players
J1 League players
J2 League players
Olympic soccer players of Australia
People from Taree
Eliteserien players
Australian Institute of Sport soccer players
Indigenous Australian Olympians
Australian expatriate soccer players
Australian soccer players
2000 OFC Nations Cup players
2002 OFC Nations Cup players
2004 OFC Nations Cup players
Footballers at the 2004 Summer Olympics
Footballers at the 2008 Summer Olympics
2011 AFC Asian Cup players
Marquee players (A-League Men)
Expatriate footballers in South Korea
Expatriate footballers in Japan
Expatriate footballers in Norway
Expatriate association footballers in New Zealand
Australian expatriate sportspeople in South Korea
Australian expatriate sportspeople in Japan
Australian expatriate sportspeople in Norway
Australian expatriate sportspeople in New Zealand
Sportsmen from New South Wales
Soccer players from New South Wales